Muḥammad Fayḍ Allāh ibn Hidāyat ʿAlī al-Islāmābādī (1890–1976), popularly known as Mufti Faizullah, was a Bangladeshi Deobandi Islamic scholar, mufti, poet, educator and a reformer. He was among early students to study at the Darul Uloom Hathazari. He was an alumnus of Darul Uloom Deoband and later served as the Chief Mufti of the Darul Uloom Hathazari. He established Mekhal Madrasa following in the style of Ashab-e Suffah. He authored over 100 books in Arabic, Persian and Urdu.

Early life and education 
Faizullah was born in 1890 to a Bengali Muslim family in the village of Mekhal in Hathazari, Chittagong district. His father, Hedayet Ali, was a munshi, while his mother, Rahimunnesa, was a housewife. He received his initial education at Darul Uloom Hathazari and was among its early students, studying under the likes of Abdul Hamid Madarshahi. In 1330 AH (1912 CE), he set off for Darul Uloom Deoband in Saharanpur, where he received higher education for two and a half years under Mahmud Hasan Deobandi, Anwar Shah Kashmiri and Aziz-ul-Rahman Usmani. He specialised in Hadith studies.

Career 
He was appointed a teacher at the Darul Uloom Hathazari in 1915, and subsequently became its Chief Mufti. He established Hami as-Sunnah Mekhal Madrasa following in the style of Ashab-e-Suffah in 1934. He was involved in the management of this madrasa until his death in 1976. He was awarded the title of "Mufti Azam" for his experience in issuing fatwas.

Literary works 
Faizullah authored about 100 books in Arabic, Persian and Urdu. He majorly focused on Aqidah and Fiqh in his writings. He extensively wrote on controversial matters for educational purposes of the Muslim community. Under the instruction of Abdul Hamid Madarshahi, Faizullah compiled the explanation of Ka'b ibn Zuhayr's Bānat Suʿād qasida into Persian.  His books include:

Arabic
  (Fayḍ al-Kalām)
  (Hidāyah al-ʿIbād)
  (Rāfiʿ al-Ishkālāt)
  (Taʿlīm al-Mubtadi)
  (Iẓhār al-Munkarāt)
  (Tawjīh al-Bayān)
  (Izālah al-Khabaṭ)
  (Targhīb al-Ummah ilā Taḥsīn an-Niyyah)
  (Iẓhār al-Ikhtilāl fī Mas'alah al-Hilāl)
  (Al-Qawl al-Sadīd fī Ḥukm al-Ahwāl wa al-Mawāʿīẓ)
  (Al-Falāḥ fīmā yataʿallaq bin-Nikāḥ)

Persian
  (Band Nāmah-e-Khākī)
  (Masnavī-e-Khākī)
  (Ershād al-Ummah)
  (Manẓūmāt-e-Mukhtasarah)
  (Qand-e-Khākī)
  (Masnavī-e-Dilpazīr)
  (Al-Faysalah Al-Jāriyah fī Awqāf al-Madāris)
  (Ḥifẓ al-Īmān)
  (Munkarāt al-Qubūr)
  (Dafʿ al-Wasāwis fī Awqāf al-Madāris)
  (Al-Ḥaq as-Ṣarīh fī Maslak as-Ṣaḥīḥ)
  (Dafʿ al-Iʿtisāf fī Aḥkām al-Iʿtikāf)
  (Iẓhār-e-Khayāl)
  (Shūmī Maʿāṣī)
  (Al-Risālah al-Manẓūmah ʿalā Fiṭrah an-Nījariyyah)

Urdu
  (Sharh-e-Būstān)
  (Sharh-e-Gulistān)
  (Hāshiyat-e-ʿAṭṭār)

Death
Faizullah died in 1396 AH (1976 CE) and was buried in front of his home in Mekhal.

References 

20th-century Muslim scholars of Islam
Hanafi fiqh scholars
Deobandis
1890 births
1976 deaths
20th-century Bengalis
Bangladeshi Sunni Muslim scholars of Islam
Bangladeshi people of Arab descent
Darul Uloom Deoband alumni
Darul Uloom Hathazari Alumni
Grand Mufti of Darul Uloom Hathazari
Bangladeshi Arabic writers
20th-century Arabic writers
People from Hathazari Upazila
20th-century Persian-language writers
20th-century Persian-language poets
20th-century Urdu-language writers